Club Trésors de Champagne (also Special Club) was founded in 1971 by 12 of the oldest families of the Champagne wine region; current membership includes  29 producers of grower Champagnes. The Special Club designated Champagnes are the tête de cuvée of each producer. The original  group of twelve growers first called  it Club de Viticultures Champenois, and in 1999  changed their name to Club Trésors de Champagne. Special Club Champagnes must be produced, bottled and aged at the member's estate, including a minimum of three years aging on lees.  The purpose of the club is to highlight the unique terroir of each family holding. Current members who were part of the founding of the group include Pierre Gimonnet, Gaston Chiquet and Paul Bara.
In 2003,  the vintage was deemed   unbalanced, and so the Club decided not to produce any Special Club wines that year.

References

See also
Henri Goutorbe

 
Champagne (wine)
Trade associations based in France